John Høholt Larsen (born 25 May 1962), known as John Larsen, is a Danish former football (soccer) player in the defender position. He played for Helsingør IF, Lyngby BK and Vejle BK, winning the 1983 and 1992 Danish championships with Lyngby. He played 19 games for the Denmark national football team, scoring one goal against the United Arab Emirates. He also represented the Denmark national under-21 football team.

References

External links 

Danish national team profile 
Danish Superliga statistics
Vejle Boldklub profile

1962 births
Living people
Danish men's footballers
Denmark under-21 international footballers
Denmark international footballers
Danish Superliga players
Vejle Boldklub players
Lyngby Boldklub players
Association football defenders